Tyson Fury vs Dillian Whyte was a professional boxing event that featured heavyweight professional boxing match contested between WBC and The Ring heavyweight champion, Tyson Fury, and WBC interim heavyweight champion, Dillian Whyte. The bout took place on Saturday 23 April 2022 at Wembley Stadium in London, England. Tyson Fury won the bout by technical knockout in round 6.

Background 
On 9 October 2021, undefeated WBC and The Ring heavyweight champion Tyson Fury defended his world titles against former WBC champion Deontay Wilder in their trilogy match, when he defeated Wilder via eleventh-round knockout in a widely acclaimed contest that was named The Ring magazine Fight of the Year 2021. Fury's mandatory challenger, Dillian Whyte, had been scheduled to face southpaw Otto Wallin in a defence of his WBC interim title later that month on 30 October, but the fight was cancelled days beforehand after it was alleged that Whyte had suffered a shoulder injury, ruling him out of contention. Whyte ultimately did not reschedule the fight, opting to bypass Wallin for a shot at Fury's world titles.

On 30 December 2021, WBC president Mauricio Sulaiman, who had ordered Fury to defend his WBC title against Whyte, ruled that the champion Fury would be entitled to 80% of the purse, compared to Whyte's 20% as the challenger. Sulaiman had set a deadline of 11 January 2022 for purse bids, as the two fighters' camps could not agree to terms. However, this deadline was pushed back multiple times, in part due to ongoing negotiations from Fury's team who were trying to secure the fight for the undisputed heavyweight championship against undefeated WBA (Super), IBF and WBO heavyweight champion Oleksandr Usyk. A fight between Fury and Usyk did not materialise, as deposed former champion Anthony Joshua was unwilling to step aside to allow the two champions to fight.

The deadline for the Fury-Whyte purse bids was ultimately scheduled for 28 January 2022, when it was announced that Frank Warren's Queensberry Promotions had won the rights to promote the fight, with a winning bid of $41,025,000 (£31 million), beating out the $32,222,222 (£24 million) bid submitted by Eddie Hearn's Matchroom. Warren's bid was reported to be the highest successful purse bid in boxing history. Fury reacted to the news, stating on social media that he is "coming home", suggesting that the fight against Whyte will be the first time he will box on U.K. soil since his August 2018 win against Francesco Pianeta. On 25 February 2022, it was officially announced that the fight would be taking place at Wembley Stadium in London, England on 23 April.

The first press conference for the fight took place on 1 March at Wembley Stadium, with Whyte absent. Whyte's lawyer stated that his client would not be partaking in promoting the fight, as "we still do not have things resolved". Despite his opponent's non-attendance, Fury as usual was "in full showman mode", declaring, "Even Tyson Fury versus his own shadow sells", and promising that the fight "is going to be a Ferrari racing a Vauxhall Corsa". When asked about Whyte's no-show, Fury opined, "He's definitely shown the white flag in my estimation." In addition, he stated that his bout against Whyte would be the final fight of his professional career, promising to retire after the fight: "I'm a two-time undisputed world champion. [I have] £150m in the bank and nothing to prove to anybody."

Tickets for the fight went on sale on 2 March. 85,000 of the 90,000 available tickets were sold within the first 3 hours, prompting Fury's promoter Frank Warren to begin the process of applying to the local authorities to expand the capacity to 100,000 fans, which would make Fury-Whyte the largest post-war boxing attendance in the history of the United Kingdom.

Fight card

Broadcasting

Notes

References 

2022 in boxing
Boxing matches
Boxing matches involving Tyson Fury
World Boxing Council heavyweight championship matches
2022 in British sport
April 2022 sports events in the United Kingdom
2022 sports events in London
Events at Wembley Stadium
Events in London